The Terminator 2029 is a first-person shooter video game developed and published by Bethesda Softworks. It is based on the Terminator film series, and was released in 1992 for DOS. It is Bethesda's second Terminator game following The Terminator (1990).

Gameplay

In The Terminator 2029, John Connor's Special Operations Group is engaged in a war with machines led by Skynet. The player takes control as one of Connor's resistance fighters as they work to destroy Skynet. The player begins as a Sergeant and can gain higher ranks such as Captain, Major, and Lieutenant Colonel.

Gameplay is generally the same in each level: the player receives a task at the command post, goes to the enemy territory, performs the task and returns to the base. Common tasks include protecting a target from enemy attacks, or finding and rescuing survivors and hostages. The game consists of eight levels with increasing difficulty, and the player can save their progress after each level. Viewed from a first-person perspective, the gameplay is restricted to four directions as turning spins the player around by 90 degrees.

The player's exoskeleton can be equipped with a variety of weapons, such as a plasma cannon and grenades. The suit also carries a portable first aid kit and generators of protective fields. Weapons, ammunition and other useful items can be selected and installed at the beginning of the level, and can be collected from destroyed opponents and dead soldiers later in each level. The character can carry up to five different items simultaneously.

Development
The game had used a new concept which was first-person POV down the barrel of a gun. Weaver said the developers at id Software took Bethesda's idea and did it better.

Deluxe CD Edition
The Deluxe CD Edition, released in 1994, includes the original game along with the 1993 expansion pack Operation Scour, giving a total of 34 missions. This edition also includes 330MB of additional mission briefings and character speech, as well as new gameplay music.

Reception

Gordon Goble of Computer Gaming World said "Those who are able to win the game in the optimal seven mission path may not become as sated as this reviewer, but I would have liked to see this product serve as more than a shoot-'em-up. The fact is that Terminator 2029 shines graphically, features an interesting premise, and supplies ample audible realism and thunder. It runs as a good computer game should, bereft of any annoying mid-play screen freezes". Finish magazine Pelit wrote "Terminator 2029 would have had the makings of a real mega-game, but without W3D graphics, plenty of sound mats, and smart fellow soldiers, it's an absolutely grueling package that must be played to a conclusion. There is no greater shortage in the game, the top game is missed because every aspect could still have been improved".

In 1996, T. Liam McDonald of PC Gamer called it a "frustrating, often impossibly difficult game" with a confusing mouse and keyboard control interface.

Just Games Retro wrote in 2004 that the game "ends up being a mostly average shooter. It’s a faithful and suitable use of the license, but it’s really quite boring most of the time. Some simple design changes could have probably fixed this – giving you health or ammo from some destroyed enemies, for starters, or points received from killing baddies that you can spend on weapon upgrades, instead of getting new ones automatically for each mission. The enemy pop-in seems to be partially design, and partially technical limitations, but the game would probably benefit from something a little more predictable, or not so overtly random that enemies teleport from nowhere. This game isn’t terrible, but Future Shock is a much better realization of what Bethesda was trying to do here".

Operation Scour

Tapio Salminen from Pelit reviewed the Operation Scour expansion pack stating that "Overall, the new additional disc is disappointing as it offers far too little new to be really interesting. Old Bugs remain uncorrected, and the base game is not replenished, let alone updated. Operation Scour is an additional feature for those who like the original game. Let the others not bother".

Sales
According to Bethesda founder Christopher Weaver, the game had good sales but not great. The game was regarded by Weaver in 1997 as one of the most popular Bethesda titles along with Wayne Gretzky Hockey 3 and the Elder Scrolls series. Ted Peterson, one of the original creators of the Elder Scrolls series, stated in 2021 that the game was a moderate success for the company.

References

External links
MobyGames: The Terminator 2029

Terminator (franchise) video games
1992 video games
Bethesda Softworks games
DOS-only games
DOS games
First-person shooters
Sprite-based first-person shooters
Video games developed in the United States
Video games scored by Julian Le Fay